Khom Ratanakmony (born 3 November 1982 in Phom Penh) is a Cambodian judoka who competes in the men's 60 kg category. At the 2012 Summer Olympics he was defeated in the second round.

References

External links
 

1982 births
Living people
Sportspeople from Phnom Penh
Cambodian male judoka
Olympic judoka of Cambodia
Judoka at the 2012 Summer Olympics
Southeast Asian Games medalists in judo
Southeast Asian Games silver medalists for Cambodia
Competitors at the 2011 Southeast Asian Games